Gary Allen Podesto (born October 19, 1941) is an American politician and businessman who served as the 75th mayor of Stockton, California from 1997 until 2005.

Personal life
Podesto went to St. Mary's High School in Stockton and graduated in 1959. He went to Marquette University in Milwaukee, Wisconsin later that year but left when the football team was cut. He instead went to Santa Clara University from which he graduated with a degree in economies in 1963. He briefly took evening classes at Humphreys College in 1960s.

In 1962, Podesto married Janice, whom he had met at St. Mary's High School.

Early career
After graduating from Santa Clara University, Podesto managed his father's Don Quick grocery store in Tracy, California. He opened a Food 4 Less grocery store in Stockton in 1984 and went on to open two more, employing about 400 employees and generating up to $120 million in annual retail sales.

Political career
Podesto sold his stores in 1996 and soon after declared his candidacy for mayor, spending what was then a local record of $206,000 on the campaign. He won more than two of every three votes cast and won an uncontested re-election in 2000.

In 2004, when term limits prevented him from running for mayor again, Podesto declared his candidacy for California's 5th State Senate district, seeking to oust State Senator Michael Machado. Podesto spent nearly $5 million on his bid but lost by more than 5 percent.

The Gary and Janice Podesto Teen Impact Center in Stockton is named after the former mayor and his wife.

Electoral history

References

Mayors of Stockton, California
California Republicans
21st-century American politicians
Marquette University alumni
Santa Clara University alumni
1941 births
Living people